The Banahao forest frog (Platymantis banahao) is a species of frog in the family Ceratobatrachidae.
It is endemic to Luzon, Philippines, where it is only known from Mount Banahaw (Banahaw and San Cristobal peaks).

Its natural habitats are subtropical or tropical moist lowland forest and subtropical or tropical moist montane forest.
It is threatened by habitat loss.

References

Platymantis
Amphibians of the Philippines
Endemic fauna of the Philippines
Fauna of Luzon
Taxonomy articles created by Polbot
Amphibians described in 1997